Kanepi is a small borough in Kanepi Parish, Põlva County in southeastern Estonia.

Hugo Treffner (1845–1912), educator, founder of the Hugo Treffner Gymnasium was born in Kanepi as a son of a family of local parish clerk.

Gallery

References

External links 
Satellite map at Maplandia.com

Boroughs and small boroughs in Estonia
Kreis Werro